The Simpsons Movie is a 2007 American animated comedy film based on the Fox animated sitcom The Simpsons. The film was directed by the show's supervising director David Silverman and stars the show's regular cast of Dan Castellaneta, Julie Kavner, Nancy Cartwright, Yeardley Smith, Hank Azaria, Harry Shearer, Tress MacNeille, Pamela Hayden, Karl Wiedergott, Marcia Wallace, Maggie Roswell, Russi Taylor, and Joe Mantegna reprising their roles and Albert Brooks as the film's main antagonist, Russ Cargill, head of the EPA. The film follows Homer Simpson, who irresponsibly pollutes the lake in Springfield, causing the Environmental Protection Agency (EPA) to imprison the town under a giant glass dome. After he and his family escape, they ultimately abandon Homer for his selfishness and return to Springfield to prevent the town's demolition by Cargill. Homer works to redeem his folly by returning to Springfield himself in an effort to save it.

Although previous attempts to create a Simpsons film had been made, they failed due to the lack of a script. Eventually in 2001, producers James L. Brooks, Matt Groening, Al Jean, Mike Scully and Richard Sakai began development on the film and a writing team consisting of Brooks, Groening, Jean, Scully, Ian Maxtone-Graham, George Meyer, David Mirkin, Mike Reiss, Matt Selman, John Swartzwelder and Jon Vitti were assembled. They conceived numerous plot ideas, with Groening's being the one adapted. The script was rewritten over a hundred times, also continuing after work on the animation began in 2006. Consequently, hours of finished material was cut from the final release, including cameo roles from Erin Brockovich, Minnie Driver, Isla Fisher, Edward Norton, and Kelsey Grammer, who would have reprised his role as Sideshow Bob. Tom Hanks and the members of Green Day voice their own animated counterparts in the final cut of the film, while Albert Brooks, a frequent guest performer on the series, provides the voice of its main antagonist, Russ Cargill.

Tie-in promotions were made with several companies to promote the film's release, including Burger King and 7-Eleven, the latter of which transformed selected stores into Kwik-E-Marts. The film premiered in Springfield, Vermont, on July 21, 2007 and was released theatrically six days later on July 27 by 20th Century Fox across the United States. The Simpsons Movie received positive reviews and grossed $536.4 million worldwide, becoming the eighth-highest-grossing film of 2007, the second-highest-grossing traditionally animated film (behind Walt Disney Animation Studios' The Lion King), and the highest-grossing film based on an animated television series.  The film received praise for its humor, emotional weight, and callbacks to early seasons. The film was nominated for numerous awards, including a Golden Globe Award for Best Animated Feature Film at the 65th Golden Globe Awards.

Plot
After finishing a concert at Lake Springfield, Green Day tries to engage the audience in a discussion about the environment, but the people refuse to listen. The pollution in the lake erodes the band's barge, causing them to drown. During their memorial, Grampa Simpson has a spiritual experience and frantically prophesies that a disaster will befall Springfield, but only Marge takes it seriously. Concerned about the terrible state of the environment, Lisa and her new friend, Colin, hold a seminar and convince the town to clean up the lake. Meanwhile, Homer and Bart go to Krusty Burger, where Homer adopts a pig to save it from being killed by Krusty the Clown. Marge, identifying the pig as a part of Grampa's prophecy, warns Homer to get rid of it, but he refuses. Homer's fawning over the pig makes Bart, now fed up with his father's carelessness, look to their neighbor, Ned Flanders, as a father figure.

Homer stores the pig's feces (and his own) in an overflowing silo, disgusting Marge. Homer attempts to dispose of it safely at Marge's request, but then learns of a place that is giving away donuts for free. In a rush to get to the giveaway, Homer dumps the silo in the lake, critically polluting it. Moments later, a squirrel stumbles into it and becomes severely mutated with many eyes, another part of the prophecy. While bonding on a hike, Bart and Ned notice the squirrel, which is captured by the Environmental Protection Agency (EPA). Russ Cargill, head of the EPA, informs president Arnold Schwarzenegger on Springfield's pollution crisis. As a response, the president orders the federals to imprison Springfield under a giant glass dome, completely fulfilling the prophecy. When Homer's silo is discovered on live television, most of the townspeople form an angry mob and attempt to lynch them. The family escapes through a sinkhole, which destroys the house soon after. The family flees to Alaska, where they try to restart their lives.

Within 93 days, Springfield completely exhausts its daily supplies and the townspeople lose their sanity while trying to escape from the dome. Cargill, who does not want word of his imprisonment of Springfield to spread, plots to destroy Springfield by tricking the president into ordering its demolition. The Simpsons see a television advertisement, featuring Tom Hanks, for a new Grand Canyon on the site of Springfield. Realizing that their hometown is in danger, all of them decide to save it except for Homer, who refuses to help the people who tried to kill them. The family soon abandons Homer for his selfishness, with Marge leaving behind a message about it recorded over their wedding video, causing him to run off in search of them. The family is captured by the EPA and placed back inside the dome. After an encounter with a mysterious Inuit shaman who saves him from a polar bear, Homer has an epiphany about saving the town to save himself.

Homer returns to Springfield and learns about his family's capture as a helicopter lowers a time bomb suspended by a rope through a hole at the top of the dome. Homer enters the dome and descends the rope, knocking the escaping townspeople and the bomb off, inadvertently shortening its countdown. Taking a motorcycle, he rides to the church and reunites with Bart. After reconciling, Bart and Homer use the motorcycle to travel up the side of the dome. Bart throws the bomb through the hole seconds before it detonates, shattering the dome and freeing the town. Later, Cargill confronts the pair with a shotgun and attempts to kill them for foiling his plan, but before he can do so, Maggie knocks him out by dropping a large rock on his head. As Cargill is fired and imprisoned for his actions, the townspeople decide to forgive Homer and hail him a hero for saving Springfield from destruction. He rides into the sunset with Marge, after which the townspeople restore Springfield to normal. As a symbol of their gratitude, the townspeople also help the Simpsons rebuild their house.

Cast

Production

Development
The production staff had considered a film adaptation of The Simpsons since early in the series. The show's creator, Matt Groening, felt a feature-length film would allow them to increase the show's scale and animate sequences too complex for the TV series. He intended the film to be made after the show ended, "but that [...] was undone by good ratings". There were attempts to adapt the fourth season episode "Kamp Krusty" into a film, but difficulties were encountered in expanding the episode to feature-length. For a long time, the project was held up. There was difficulty finding a story that was sufficient for a film, and the crew did not have enough time to complete such a project, as they already worked full-time on the show. Groening also expressed a wish to make Simpstasia, a parody of Fantasia; it was never produced, partly because it would have been too difficult to write a feature-length script. At another point, it was briefly suggested to do an anthology-style Treehouse of Horror film, but such suggestion was never pursued. Recurring guest performer Phil Hartman had wished to make a live-action film based on his character Troy McClure; several of the show's staff expressed a desire to help create it, and Josh Weinstein proposed to use the plot of the 1996 episode "A Fish Called Selma" for the film, but the project was canceled following Hartman's death in 1998. The project was officially green-lit by 20th Century Fox in 1997, and Groening and James L. Brooks were set to produce the film.

The voice cast was signed on to do the film in 2001, and work then began on the script. The producers were initially worried that creating a film would have a negative effect on the series, as they did not have enough crew to focus their attention on both projects. As the series progressed, additional writers and animators were hired so that both the show and the film could be produced at the same time. Groening and Brooks invited Mike Scully and Al Jean (who continued to work as showrunner on the television series) to produce the film with them. They then signed series director David Silverman to direct the film. The "strongest possible" writing team was assembled, with many of the writers from the show's early seasons being chosen. David Mirkin, Mike Reiss, George Meyer, John Swartzwelder, and Jon Vitti were selected. Ian Maxtone-Graham and Matt Selman would also join later, and Brooks, Groening, Scully, and Jean also wrote parts of the script. Sam Simon did not return having left the show over creative differences in 1993. Former writer Conan O'Brien expressed interest in working with the Simpsons staff again, although he later joked that "I worry that the Simpsons-writing portion of my brain has been destroyed after 14 years of talking to Lindsay Lohan and that guy from One Tree Hill, so maybe it's all for the best." The same went for director Brad Bird who said he had "entertained fantasies of asking if [he] could work on the movie", but did not have enough time due to work on films like The Incredibles and Ratatouille. The producers arranged a deal with Fox that would allow them to abandon production of the film at any point if they felt the script was unsatisfactory.

Work continued on the screenplay from late 2003 onwards, taking place in the small bungalow where Matt Groening first pitched The Simpsons in 1987. The writers spent six months discussing a plot, and each of them offered sketchy ideas. On their first brainstorming session, Scully suggested a story in which Steven Spielberg (intended to be voiced by Spielberg himself) would try to blow up Springfield so he could shoot a film with Tom Hanks (who ultimately made a guest appearance voicing himself in the finished film). It was also on this same reunion that Groening introduced the idea of Homer adopting a pet pig, inspired by a pig-waste management story he had read in the news. Jean suggested the family rescue manatees, which became the 2005 episode "The Bonfire of the Manatees", and there was also a notion similar to that of The Truman Show where the characters discovered their lives were a TV show. Groening rejected this, as he felt that the Simpsons should "never become aware of themselves as celebrities", but the idea was later used in the video game The Simpsons Game. Groening read about a town that had to get rid of pig feces in their water supply, which inspired the plot of the film. The decision for Flanders to have an important role also came early on, as Jean wished to see Bart wonder what his life would be like if Flanders were his father. Hank Scorpio, a character from the 1996 episode "You Only Move Twice", was originally meant to return as the main antagonist, but the staff dropped the idea and created Russ Cargill instead.

Having eventually decided on the basic outline of the plot for the film, the writers then separated it into seven sections. Jean, Scully, Reiss, Swartzwelder, Vitti, Mirkin, and Meyer wrote 25 pages each, and the group met one month later to merge the seven sections into one "very rough draft". The film's script was written in the same way as the television series: the writers sitting around a table, pitching ideas, and trying to make each other laugh. The script was rewritten over 100 times, and at one point, the film was a musical. However, the songs were continually being shortened and the idea was dropped. Groening described his desire to also make the film dramatically stronger than a TV episode, saying that he wanted to "give you something that you haven't seen before".

Animation

Animation for the film began in January 2006, with the Itchy & Scratchy short being the first scene to be storyboarded. Groening rejected making either a live-action or a CGI film, calling the film's animation "deliberately imperfect" and "a tribute to the art of hand-drawn animation". The film was produced in a widescreen 2.40:1 aspect ratio, to distinguish it from the look of the television series, and colored with the largest palette the animators ever had available to them. A lot of the animation was produced using Wacom Cintiq tablets, which allowed images to be drawn directly onto a computer monitor to facilitate production. Animation production work was divided among four studios around the world: Film Roman in Burbank, California, Rough Draft Studios in Glendale, California and Seoul, South Korea, and AKOM, also in Seoul, South Korea, all of whom previously worked on the series. As with the television series, the storyboarding, characters, background layout, and animatic parts of production, were done in America. The overseas studios completed the inbetweening, digital ink and paint, and rendered the animation to tape before being shipped back to the United States.

Director David Silverman said that unlike the TV series where "you [have] to pick and choose", the film gave them the opportunity to "lavish that attention [on] every single scene". The characters have shadows, unlike in the show. Silverman and the animators looked to films such as The Incredibles, The Triplets of Belleville, and Bad Day at Black Rock for inspiration, as they were "a great education in staging because of how the characters are placed". They also looked for ideas for a dream sequence, in Disney films such as Dumbo and the Pluto cartoon Pluto's Judgment Day and for crowd scenes in It's a Mad, Mad, Mad, Mad World. Silverman looked at some of the Simpsons episodes he had directed, primarily his two favorites, "Homie the Clown" and "Three Men and a Comic Book". Mike B. Anderson, Lauren MacMullan, Rich Moore and Steven Dean Moore each directed the animation for around a quarter of the film under Silverman's supervision, with numerous other animators working on scenes.

Casting

For inspiration for the crowd scenes in the film, the production staff referenced a poster featuring more than 320 Simpsons characters. Groening said they tried to include every single character in the film, with 98 having speaking parts, and most members of the crowds being previously established characters instead of generic people. The series' regular voice actors: Dan Castellaneta, Julie Kavner, Nancy Cartwright, Yeardley Smith, Hank Azaria and Harry Shearer, as well as semi-regular performers Tress MacNeille, Pamela Hayden, Marcia Wallace, Maggie Roswell, Russi Taylor and Karl Wiedergott, reprised their roles. Joe Mantegna returned as Fat Tony, while Albert Brooks, who supplied many guest voices in episodes, was cast as the main antagonist Russ Cargill after he told the staff that he wanted to be part of the film. For "about a week", Brooks was to reprise the role of Hank Scorpio, but when the character was omitted from the film, he ended up voicing Cargill himself.

The cast did the first of three table readings in May 2005, and began recording every week from June 2006 until the end of production. James L. Brooks directed them for the first time since the television show's early seasons. Castellaneta found the recording sessions "more intense" than recording the television series and "more emotionally dramatic". Some scenes, such as Marge's video message to Homer, were recorded over one hundred times, leaving the voice cast exhausted.

The writers had written the opening concert scene without a specific band in mind. Green Day were cast in that role having requested to guest star in the show. Tom Hanks also appears as himself in the film and accepted the offer after just one phone call. Everybody Loves Raymond creator Philip Rosenthal provides the voice of the father in the "new Grand Canyon" commercial with Hanks. Due to time restraints, several guests who had recorded parts were cut from the film. Minnie Driver recorded the part of a patronizing grievance counselor in a scene that ended up being cut. Edward Norton recorded the part of the man who gets crushed as the dome is implemented, performing a Woody Allen impression. The staff felt the voice was too distracting, so Castellaneta re-recorded Norton's dialogue with a different voice. Isla Fisher and Erin Brockovich also recorded cameos, but their scenes were cut. Kelsey Grammer recorded lines for Sideshow Bob, who was to appear at several different points, but these scenes were also cut. Johnny Knoxville was also touted as a possible guest star.

Although he does not provide the voice, Arnold Schwarzenegger is president of the United States rather than then-President George W. Bush because, according to Groening, "in two years ... the film [would be] out of date". Brooks was nervous about the idea, noting that "[Schwarzenegger's] opinion polls were way down", and has said that they "were [hoping] he'd make a political comeback". The animators began by drawing an accurate caricature of Schwarzenegger, but one of the staff instead suggested an altered version of recurring character Rainier Wolfcastle as President. This idea was developed, with the design of Wolfcastle, himself also a caricature of Schwarzenegger, being given more wrinkles under his eyes and a different hairstyle.

Editing
Every aspect of the film was constantly analyzed, with storylines, jokes and characters regularly being rewritten. Although most animated films do not make extensive changes to the film during active production due to budget restrictions, The Simpsons Movie crew continued to edit their film into 2007, with some edits taking place as late as May, two months before the film was released. James L. Brooks noted, "70 percent of the things in [one of the trailers]—based on where we were eight weeks ago—are no longer in the movie." Matt Groening said that enough material for two more films was cut. Various new characters were created, and then cut because they did not contribute enough.

Originally Marge was the character who had the prophetic vision in church. The writers however considered this to be too dark and it was changed to Grampa. The role of Lisa's love interest Colin was frequently revised. He was previously named Dexter and Adrien, and his appearance was completely altered. One idea was to have Milhouse act as Lisa's love interest, but the writers realized "the audience was not as familiar with [his] long-standing crush on [Lisa] as [they had] thought". A car chase in which Homer throws flaming mummies out of a truck at the EPA was replaced with "more emotional and realistic" scenes at the motel and carnival that allowed for a change of pace. The scene of a naked Bart on his skateboard was Matt Groening's idea, who had always wanted to have Bart skateboarding naked, and Mike Scully had the idea of showing Bart's penis for two seconds. Storyboard artist Martin Archer was credited for devising the way to cover Bart's genitals with different things before they are exposed to the viewer. While the crew agreed that the gag would be funny, they wondered it if would mean an R-rating for the film, as they were happy with a PG-13 rating and that the gag was nonsexual and silly. They were ultimately able to get away with the joke because it wasn't live-action nor was it Homer's genitals.

Further changes were made after the March 2007 preview screenings of the film in Portland, Oregon and Phoenix, Arizona. This included the deletion of Kang and Kodos heavily criticizing the film during the end credits. A lot of people at the screenings found the original film too coarse, and some of Homer's behavior too unkind, so several scenes were toned down to make him appear nicer. Russ Cargill was redesigned several times, originally appearing as an older man whose speech patterns Albert Brooks based on Donald Rumsfeld. The older model was the one used by Burger King for the action figure.

Cargill's scene with Bart and Homer at the film's conclusion was added in to fully resolve his story, and the "Spider-Pig" gag was also a late addition. One excised scene, before the dome is put over Springfield, had Mr. Burns reminding viewers that it was the last point in the film that they could get a refund. Other deletions included Homer's encounter with a sausage truck driver, a scene with Plopper the pig at the end, and a news report, showing the dome's effect on daily life in Springfield in areas such as farming and sports, all of which were featured on the DVD, were cut because they did not fit the overall context of the film. Several musical numbers, at various intervals throughout the film, were cut. These included a song about Alaska, featuring music by Dave Stewart of Eurythmics. Jean said it "got pretty far along in the animation, and then we got scared that the movie began to drag in that section."

Music

Producer James L. Brooks chose Hans Zimmer to compose the film's score, as they were good friends and regular collaborators. Zimmer felt that the score was a "unique challenge", and he had to "try and express the style of The Simpsons without wearing the audience out". He used Danny Elfman's original opening theme, but did not wish to overuse it. He created themes for each member of the family. Homer's leitmotif was a major focus, and Zimmer also composed smaller themes for Bart and Marge. Regular television series composer Alf Clausen was not asked to score the film, noting: "sometimes you're the windshield, sometimes you're the bug".

In addition to their appearance in the film, Green Day recorded its own version of the Simpsons theme, and released it as a single. Zimmer turned the Spider-Pig song into a choral piece, which was a joke he never intended to be put into the film. Zimmer also had to write foreign-language lyrics for the 32 dubbed versions of the song when the film was released internationally. He found translating the song into Spanish the hardest to write. The same choir learned to sing the piece for each of the foreign-language dubs.

Themes

Al Jean described the film's message as being "a man should listen to his wife". In addition, the film parodies two major contemporary issues, religion and environmentalism. The theme of environmentalism is present throughout the film: in Homer's polluting of Lake Springfield, Green Day's cameo, Lisa's activism and her romance with Colin. The villainous Russ Cargill is head of the Environmental Protection Agency. Reviewer Ed Gonzalez argued the plot was a satire of the government's reaction to the effects of Hurricane Katrina on New Orleans. Ian Nathan of Empire magazine criticized this focus, believing it gave the film an "overt political agenda [which] border[s] on polemic". James D. Bloom of Muhlenberg College commented on the "explicitness" of the film's "intellectual agenda", on this issue, shown particularly through Lisa. He wrote that the film's first post-opening credits scene, which sees Green Day fail in an attempt to engage their audience on the issue of the environment, "sets in motion a plot expressly built around cultural agenda-setting" and "reflection on timely 'issues'."

Religion is focused on in Grampa's momentary possession, and Marge believing what he said to be a message from God. Groening joked the film "posit[s] the existence of a very active God", when asked if he believed it was likely to offend. Mark I. Pinsky, author of The Gospel According to The Simpsons, said the film "treats genuine faith with respect, while keeping a sharp eye out for religious pretension and hypocrisy of all kinds". Regarding the scene where the tenants of Moe's Tavern and the Church switch locations, he believed it took the "chance to unmask everyone's human fallibility." In analyzing the role of Ned Flanders, he wrote, "It is [the] willingness of The Simpsons to depict all the different sides of us [...] that makes it so rich and funny on our complicated relationship with religion." Trees are a motif in the film, and they were implemented in every important or emotional scene throughout the film. The animators inserted an apple tree behind Lisa and Colin during their initial meeting, which was a reference to the biblical figures of Adam and Eve and the Garden of Eden.

Cultural references
Many cultural references and allusions are made throughout the film. Green Day play "Nearer, My God, to Thee" on violins as their barge sinks, in a sequence parodying the film Titanic. When Bart is riding his skateboard naked, different passing objects are almost constantly covering his genitalia, a nod to similar techniques used in Austin Powers: International Man of Mystery. Homer and Marge's love scene parodies many Disney films, including Cinderella, with Disney-style animals helping them undress. Originally, the music from The Wizard of Oz was used in that scene, and the fawn had white spots; these were removed because the animators felt it resembled Bambi too clearly. Bart impersonates Mickey Mouse on the train, calling himself "the mascot of an evil corporation". Homer plays Grand Theft Walrus, an allusion to the video game series Grand Theft Auto. In the game, his character shoots a tap-dancing penguin in reference to the film Happy Feet. The "Spider-Pig" song is a parody of the theme song of the 1967 Spider-Man TV series, and the name of Lisa's lecture is An Irritating Truth, a play on Al Gore's film An Inconvenient Truth. The bomb disposal robot was based on Vincent D'Onofrio's character Leonard "Pyle" Lawrence from the film Full Metal Jacket, who commits suicide in a similar way. At the end of the film, the crowd's celebration is similar to the conclusion of Return of the Jedi, with Carl performing exactly the same hand gestures as Lando Calrissian.

The $1,000 Homer received when entering Alaska is a reference to the Alaska Permanent Fund Dividend. As Homer leaves Eski-Moe's he grabs on to a passing truck and uses it to propel himself back to the house, a tribute to actor Buster Keaton, while the epiphany scene features homages to the film Brazil and the works of Salvador Dalí. Hillary Clinton appears as Itchy's vice president, while an Orc from The Lord of the Rings appears in the mob scene. A scene that was cut had Marge and the kids appear on the TV talk show The View to spread the news of Springfield's impending doom. Parts were written for the show's entire panel and the scene was planned to feature Russ Cargill having a gunfight with Joy Behar. Another dropped scene featured Moe describing Springfield's varying physical states inside the dome, one of which was the Disneyland ride Autopia. There are several references to events in previous TV episodes of The Simpsons. These include the wreckage of the ambulance from the episode "Bart the Daredevil" crashed into a tree next to Springfield Gorge. The Carpenters' song "(They Long to Be) Close to You" was used in Homer and Marge's wedding video and had also been used in several emotional moments between them in the TV series.

Release

Theatrical

On April 1, 2006, 20th Century Fox announced that the film would be released worldwide on July 27, 2007. The film was released a day earlier in Australia and the United Kingdom. Little information about the plot was released in the weeks building up to the film's release. Groening did not feel that "people look in the TV section of the newspaper and think, 'I'll watch this week's Simpsons because I like the plot.' You just tune in and see what happens."

Fox held a competition among 16 Springfields across the United States to host the American premiere. Each Springfield produced a film, explaining why their town should host the premiere, with the results being decided via a vote on the USA Today website. Springfield, Minnesota dropped out on May 31, 2007. The winner was announced on July 10 to be Springfield, Vermont. The town beat Springfield, Illinois by 15,367 votes to 14,634. Each of the other 14 entrants held their own smaller screenings of the film on July 26. Springfield, Vermont hosted the world premiere of the film on July 21 with a yellow carpet instead of the traditional red.

The film was rated PG-13 by the Motion Picture Association of America for "irreverent humor throughout"; the production staff had expected this rating. However, the British Board of Film Classification passed the film as a PG with no cuts made. A BBFC spokeswoman said regarding Bart's brief nude scene, "natural nudity with no sexual content is acceptable in PG films". The film was banned in Myanmar, not for the scene of nudity, but for the excessive use of the colors yellow and red, which is prohibited in the country.

Marketing

The convenience store chain 7-Eleven transformed 11 of its stores in the U.S. and one in Canada into Kwik-E-Marts, at the cost of approximately $10 million. 7-Eleven also sold Simpsons-themed merchandise in many of its stores. This included "Squishees", "Buzz Cola", "Krusty-O's" Cereal, and "Pink Movie Donuts". This promotion resulted in a 30% increase in profits for the altered 7-Eleven stores. Homer performed a special animated opening monologue for the edition of July 24, 2007 of The Tonight Show with Jay Leno, as part of another promotion.

Promotions also occurred around the world. 20th Century Fox erected a "giant pink donut" in the town of Springfield in Canterbury, New Zealand to celebrate being named Springfield, while in London a double decker-sized floating inflatable Spider Pig was set up by the Battersea Power Station. In Dorset, England, an image of Homer was painted next to the hill figure, the Cerne Abbas Giant. This caused outrage amongst local neopagans who performed "rain magic" to try to get it washed away.

McFarlane Toys released a line of action figures based on the film while EA Games released The Simpsons Game to coincide with the film's DVD release, although the plot of the game was not based on the film. Samsung released The Simpsons Movie phone, and Microsoft produced a limited edition The Simpsons Movie Xbox 360. Ben & Jerry's created a Simpsons-themed beer and donut-flavored ice cream, entitled "Duff & D'oh! Nuts". Windows Live Messenger presented their users with the opportunity to download a free animated and static content for use within their conversations. Burger King produced a line of Simpsons toy figures that were given away with children's meals, and ran a series of Simpsons-themed television adverts to promote this. JetBlue Airways held a series of online sweepstakes to win a trip to the film's Los Angeles, California premiere. They also included a channel dedicated to The Simpsons on their planes' in-flight entertainment system.

Home media

The film was released on DVD and Blu-ray Disc worldwide on December 3, 2007, and on December 18 in the United States. It contains commentary tracks from both the producers and animators, six short deleted scenes, and a selection of material used to promote the film release. An unfinished deleted scene of the townspeople singing the Springfield Anthem was also included on The Simpsons The Complete Tenth Season DVD box set.

Promotions for the DVD release occurred across the United States. The Empire State Building was illuminated yellow, the first time the building had ever been used as part of a film promotion. In the United Kingdom, Fox launched a £5 million advertising campaign. They also signed a £1.6 million deal with the yogurt company Yoplait, to produce a The Simpsons Movie design for their brand Frubes. In its first week it topped the U.S. DVD chart, and generated $11.8 million in rental revenue.

Reception

Critical reception

On Rotten Tomatoes, the film has an approval rating of 87% based on 223 reviews and an average rating of 7.5/10. The site's critical consensus reads, "The Simpsons Movie contains the hearty laughs, biting satire, and honest portrayal of an American family that makes the show so popular. And it boasts slicker animation and polished writing that hearkens back to the show's glory days." On Metacritic, it received a score of 80 out of 100, based on 36 critics, indicating "generally favorable reviews". Audiences polled by CinemaScore gave the film an average grade of "A−" on an A+ to F scale.

British newspapers The Guardian and The Times both gave the film four out of five stars. The Times' James Bone said that it "boasts the same sly cultural references and flashes of brilliance that have earned the television series a following that ranges from tots to comparative literature PhDs". The Guardian's Peter Bradshaw stated that it "gives you everything you could possibly want" and that he thought, "Eighty-five minutes [was] not long enough to do justice to 17 years of comedy genius". Ed Gonzalez praised the film for its political message, likening the Itchy & Scratchy cartoon at the beginning to President Schwarzenegger's situation later on, as well as the film's visual gags. Randy Shulman praised the cast, and described them as having "elevated their vocal work to a craft that goes way beyond simple line readings", and particularly praised Kavner who he said "gave what must be the most heartfelt performance ever". Roger Ebert gave a positive review of three out of four stars, but admitted he was "generally [not] a fan of movies spun off from TV animation". He called it "radical and simple at the same time, subversive and good-hearted, offensive without really meaning to be". Richard Corliss of Time said that the film "doesn't try to be ruder or kinkier, just bigger and better".

USA Today film critic Claudia Puig said that the story did "warrant a full-length feature, thanks to a clever plot and non-stop irreverent humor". Patrick Kolan believed that the film was "easily the best stuff to come [from the Simpsons] since season 12 or 13" and praised the animation, but also said that the appearances of characters such as Comic Book Guy and Seymour Skinner were "small and unfunny". Kirk Honeycutt of The Hollywood Reporter praised the film's good nature, stating that the laughs "come in all sizes", but also noted that, "little has been gained bringing the Simpsons to the screen."

Variety's Brian Lowry called it "clever, irreverent, satirical and outfitted" but that it was "just barely" capable of sustaining a running time longer than a television episode. Lisa Schwarzbaum praised the voice cast but stated that the "'action' sequences sometimes falter". When comparing the film to the early episodes of the show, Stephen Rowley concluded that the film "has more going for it than the show in its later years, but is still a long way short of what made it so invigorating". The Monthly critic Luke Davies echoed Lowry's concerns about the length: "everything moves with the whip-crack speed of a half-hour episode. And that's the paradox: it makes the film feel like three episodes strung together. We're in a cinema, and we expect something epic." He opined that "in the great arc that is the history of The Simpsons, this film will come to be seen as oddity rather than apotheosis."

More negative reception came from the magazine Empire, where reviewer Ian Nathan compared the film to New Coke, saying that "it utterly failed". Phil Villarreal believed that there were "too few laugh-worthy moments" and that "instead of stretching to new frontiers, the film rests on the familiar". Sheila Johnston criticized the pacing of the film and its joke level saying that "the overall momentum flags at times" and that it was "a salvo of comic squibs, some very funny, others limp". David Edwards agreed with this, writing that although "there's a great half-hour show rattling around...the rest is padding at its very dullest", concluding that it "isn't a terrible film, just a terribly disappointing one." Cosmo Landesman believed, "the humour seem[ed] to have lost its satirical bite and wit" and that "much of the comedy is structured around the idiocy of Homer". This assessment was shared by Carina Chocano of the Los Angeles Times, who felt that "once the movie wanders into its contemplation of mortality and meaning, the trenchancy kind of creaks and falls off." She negatively compared it to South Park: Bigger, Longer & Uncut (1999), a film similarly adapted from an animated television series, saying that, in terms of satire, it offers "nothing we don't hear every night on The Daily Show with Jon Stewart." Bruce Newman criticized the fleeting appearances of many of the show's secondary characters, and found the film to be "a disappointment".

Box office
The film earned $30,758,269 on its opening day in the United States making it the 25th-highest, and fifth-highest non-sequel opening day revenue of all time. It grossed a combined total of $74,036,787 in its opening weekend on 5,500 screens at 3,922 theaters, reaching the top of the box office for that weekend. This made it the tenth-highest revenue of all time, for an opening weekend in July, and highest among non-sequels, and the highest animated TV adaptation of all time, surpassing The SpongeBob SquarePants Movie. This outperformed the expectations of $40 million that Fox had for the release.

It set several American box office records, including highest grossing opening weekend for a non-CG animated film and for a film based on a television series, surpassing Mission: Impossible 2. It was also the third-highest grossing opening weekend for an animated film. It opened at the top of the international box office taking $96 million from 71 overseas territories, including $27.8 million in the United Kingdom, the second-highest UK opening ever for a 20th Century Fox film. It contributed to over half of the record 5.5 million people attending British cinemas that weekend. In Australia, it grossed $13.2 million, the third-highest opening weekend in the country, and the highest for an animated film. The United Kingdom is the highest-grossing country for the film outside in the United States with a $78.4 million gross overall, with Germany in second place with a $36.3 million gross overall. The film closed on December 20, 2007 with a gross of $183.1 million in the United States and a worldwide gross of $536.4 million. It was the eighth-highest-grossing film worldwide and the twelfth-highest grossing in the United States of 2007.

Accolades

The Simpsons Movie won the award for Best Comedy Film at the British Comedy Awards, Best Animation at the inaugural ITV National Movie Awards, and Best Movie at the UK Nickelodeon Kids Choice Awards, beating Harry Potter and the Order of the Phoenix, Pirates of the Caribbean: At World's End, and Shrek the Third. The film's trailer won a Golden Trailer Award in the category Best Animated/Family Film Trailer at the 8th Annual Golden Trailer Awards. Forbes named the film the third best of the year, based on its box office takings and Metacritic critical response score. The film's website received a Webby Award at the 12th Annual Webby Awards in the category "Best Movie and Film Website".

At the 35th Annie Awards the film was nominated in four categories: Best Animated Feature, Directing in an Animated Feature Production, Writing in an Animated Feature Production, and Voice Acting in an Animated Feature Production for Julie Kavner. All four awards were won by Ratatouille. It was nominated for Best Animated Feature Film at the 65th Golden Globe Awards, the BAFTA for Best Animated Film, and the Producers Guild Award for Animated Theatrical Motion Picture. It also received nominations for the Satellite Award for Best Animated or Mixed Media Feature, the Chicago Film Critics Association Award for Best Animated Feature, and the Broadcast Film Critics Association Award for Best Animated Feature.

Before its release, the film received a nomination at the 2007 MTV Movie Awards for "Best Summer Movie You Haven't Seen Yet", with the award ultimately won by Transformers, and lost the Teen Choice Award for "Choice Summer Movie – Comedy/Musical", which was won by Hairspray. It was also nominated for Favorite Movie Comedy at the People's Choice Awards, losing to Knocked Up.

Sequel 
In 2014, Brooks stated that he had been approached by Fox and that they had requested a second film. He added that there were no immediate plans, stating, "We've been asked to [develop it], but we haven't. We're doing a lot of other stuff." In December 2014, just prior to the broadcast of the episode "The Man Who Came to Be Dinner", Jean wrote on Twitter that the episode (which had been produced in 2012 and was originally set to air in May 2013) had been held back by himself and Brooks because it was being considered for adaptation into a sequel film as the episode was "cinematic". Jean later expanded that there was the fear of the potential film being considered "not canonical" with the TV series and the potential backlash of overcoming it by using a "memory wipe". In July 2017, Silverman and Jean said that the sequel was in the early stages of development and stressed the toll production of the first picture took on the entire staff. On August 10, 2018, it was reported that a sequel was in development. On July 22, 2019, Groening stated that he had "no doubts" that The Walt Disney Company, which acquired 21st Century Fox early that year, would likely produce a sequel one day. In July 2021, Jean stated that discussions for the potential sequel had stalled due to the COVID-19 pandemic.

References

External links

 
 

2007 films
2007 animated films
2007 comedy films
2007 directorial debut films
2000s American animated films
20th Century Fox animated films
20th Century Fox Animation films
20th Century Fox films
Film Roman films
Fox Television Animation films
Gracie Films films
Rough Draft Studios films
American adult animated films
American animated comedy films
Animated films based on animated series
Animated films based on animated television series
Animated films set in the United States
Films based on television series
The Simpsons
Films about dysfunctional families
Films directed by David Silverman
Films produced by James L. Brooks
Films produced by Matt Groening
Films set in 2007
Films scored by Hans Zimmer
Films with screenplays by James L. Brooks
Films with screenplays by John Swartzwelder
Films with screenplays by Matt Groening
2000s English-language films